Sharifabad (also Romanized as Sharīfābād) is a village in Kahrizak Rural District, Kahrizak District, Ray County, Tehran Province, Iran. At the 2006 census, its population was 31, in 7 families.

References 

Populated places in Ray County, Iran